Ławrynowicz is a Polish surname. It may refer to:
 Dariusz Ławrynowicz (born 1979), Lithuanian basketball player of Polish descent
 Krzysztof Ławrynowicz (born 1979), Lithuanian basketball player of Polish descent
 Małgorzata Ławrynowicz (born 1988), Polish group rhythmic gymnast
 Mirosław Ławrynowicz (1947,2005), Polish violinist
 Stanisław Ławrynowicz, Wilno school massacre perpetrator

Polish-language surnames